Pseudococcus is a genus of unarmoured scale insects in the family Pseudococcidae, the mealy bugs.  There are more than 150 species of Pseudococcus.

Species
Species include:

Pseudococcus aberrans
Pseudococcus acirculus
Pseudococcus affinis
Pseudococcus africanus
Pseudococcus agavis
Pseudococcus agropyri
Pseudococcus anestios
Pseudococcus aneurae
Pseudococcus angkorensis
Pseudococcus antricolens
Pseudococcus apomicrocirculus
Pseudococcus araucariarum
Pseudococcus aridorum
Pseudococcus atalestus
Pseudococcus baliteus
Pseudococcus bambusicola
Pseudococcus bambusifolii
Pseudococcus barleriae
Pseudococcus beardsleyi
Pseudococcus bermudensis
Pseudococcus bingervillensis
Pseudococcus brevicornis
Pseudococcus bryberia
Pseudococcus calceolariae
Pseudococcus callitris
Pseudococcus capensis
Pseudococcus caricus
Pseudococcus carrietoniensis
Pseudococcus carthami
Pseudococcus casuarinae
Pseudococcus chenopodii
Pseudococcus cimensis
Pseudococcus citriculus
Pseudococcus colliculosus
Pseudococcus comstocki
Pseudococcus concavocerarii
Pseudococcus cryptus
Pseudococcus cunninghamii
Pseudococcus darwiniensis
Pseudococcus dasyliriae
Pseudococcus daymananus
Pseudococcus debregeasiae
Pseudococcus defluiteri
Pseudococcus dendrobiorum
Pseudococcus dispar
Pseudococcus diversus
Pseudococcus dolichomelos
Pseudococcus donrileyi
Pseudococcus dorsospinosus
Pseudococcus dybasi
Pseudococcus dysmicus
Pseudococcus edgeworthiae
Pseudococcus elisae
Pseudococcus elscholtriae
Pseudococcus epidendrus
Pseudococcus eremophilae
Pseudococcus eremosus
Pseudococcus eriocerei
Pseudococcus espeletiae
Pseudococcus eucalypticus
Pseudococcus farnesianae
Pseudococcus floriger
Pseudococcus formicarius
Pseudococcus galapagoensis
Pseudococcus gallicola
Pseudococcus gilbertensis
Pseudococcus goodeniae
Pseudococcus gouxi
Pseudococcus graminivorus
Pseudococcus grayi
Pseudococcus hirsutus
Pseudococcus hypergaeus
Pseudococcus importatus
Pseudococcus insularis
Pseudococcus jackbeardsleyi
Pseudococcus kawecki
Pseudococcus kikuyuensis
Pseudococcus kingii
Pseudococcus kosztarabi
Pseudococcus kozari
Pseudococcus kraussi
Pseudococcus kusaiensis
Pseudococcus landoi
Pseudococcus lepelleyi
Pseudococcus linearis
Pseudococcus longipes
Pseudococcus longisetosus
Pseudococcus longispinus
Pseudococcus lycopodii
Pseudococcus macrocirculus
Pseudococcus macswaini
Pseudococcus malacearum
Pseudococcus mandio
Pseudococcus maritimus
Pseudococcus marshallensis
Pseudococcus masakensis
Pseudococcus mascarensis
Pseudococcus megasetosus
Pseudococcus mendiculus
Pseudococcus microadonidum
Pseudococcus microcirculus
Pseudococcus microosteoli
Pseudococcus mintaroicus
Pseudococcus moldavicus
Pseudococcus montanus
Pseudococcus monticola
Pseudococcus moribensis
Pseudococcus multiductus
Pseudococcus multiporus
Pseudococcus nakaharai
Pseudococcus neomaritimus
Pseudococcus neomicrocirculus
Pseudococcus nitidus
Pseudococcus notabilis
Pseudococcus nudus
Pseudococcus obscurus
Pseudococcus occiduus
Pseudococcus odermatti
Pseudococcus ogasawarensis
Pseudococcus onustus
Pseudococcus orchidicola
Pseudococcus pahanensis
Pseudococcus peregrinabundus
Pseudococcus perforatus
Pseudococcus pertusus
Pseudococcus pipturicolus
Pseudococcus pithecellobii
Pseudococcus pittospori
Pseudococcus portiludovici
Pseudococcus prunicolus
Pseudococcus pseudobscurus
Pseudococcus pseudocitriculus
Pseudococcus pseudofilamentosus
Pseudococcus pseudoperrisii
Pseudococcus puertoricensis
Pseudococcus queenslandicus
Pseudococcus quinyambiensis
Pseudococcus saccharicola
Pseudococcus savescui
Pseudococcus schusteri
Pseudococcus scrobicularum
Pseudococcus similans
Pseudococcus simplex
Pseudococcus sociabilis
Pseudococcus solani
Pseudococcus solenedyos
Pseudococcus solomonensis
Pseudococcus sorghiellus
Pseudococcus spanocera
Pseudococcus sparsus
Pseudococcus spathoglottidis
Pseudococcus swezeyi
Pseudococcus symoni
Pseudococcus syringae
Pseudococcus syzygii
Pseudococcus theobromae
Pseudococcus tirolensis
Pseudococcus transylvanicus
Pseudococcus trukensis
Pseudococcus viburni
Pseudococcus wachendorfiae
Pseudococcus xanthorrhoeae
Pseudococcus yapensis
Pseudococcus zahradniki
Pseudococcus zamiae
Pseudococcus zelandicus

Photos

References

Sternorrhyncha genera
Pseudococcidae